Ioan Vancea (May 18, 1820—July 31, 1892) was an Austro-Hungarian ethnic Romanian bishop of the Greek-Catholic Church. Born to noble parents in Văşad, Bihor County, he was ordained a priest in 1845 following studies in Oradea and Vienna. After the death of Ioan Alexi, he was consecrated Bishop of Gherla in 1865. Three years later, following the death of Alexandru Sterca-Șuluțiu, he was elected Archbishop of Făgăraş and Alba Iulia, enthroned at Blaj in 1869. He advocated the rights of Romanians in Transylvania and contested the authorities' policy of Magyarization. Vancea died in office in 1892.

Notes

1820 births
1892 deaths
People from Bihor County
Romanian Austro-Hungarians
Primates of the Romanian Greek Catholic Church
19th-century Eastern Catholic archbishops
19th-century Romanian people
Eastern Catholic bishops in Romania